Eurocops is a European television crime TV-series produced between 1988 and 1992. It is a co-production between seven European TV stations in which each station produced a number of episodes which were then pooled, dubbed and otherwise adapted when needed and broadcast by all participating stations, a format used earlier in the German crime series Tatort. The participating networks were ZDF from Germany, ORF from Austria, SRG from Switzerland, RAI from Italy, Televisión Española from Spain, Antenne 2 from France and Channel 4 from the United Kingdom.

A direct consequence of the 'pooled production' format was that all episodes by one particular network had a strong local -even national- feel and were distinctly different from the episodes produced by other networks. Not only were they filmed in the network's own country with local actors, but they were also written by local screenwriters, thus reflecting that nation's specific taste for crime dramas. With national networks at that time still relying on self-produced programs, a big part of Eurocop's allure was that it offered viewers in one country a first-hand look at what crime series in other countries looked like.

Despite being a pan-European TV series, the three German speaking networks did more than half of the filming with Germany and Austria filming 15 episodes on their own and one more joint production. Switzerland contributed another 12. Of the four non-German speaking countries, Italy made 13 episodes and France made 8, whereas Spain and the UK made only 4 and 3 episodes respectively.

All in all, in a span of five and a half years, seventy-one episodes were produced. Typically they were broadcast once a month. In Germany, ZDF broadcast the series on every fourth Friday as part of its Friday night crime lineup. (The three other Fridays it would broadcast episodes from other homemade crime series). Its first broadcast was on November 6, 1988 with a Swiss production called "Tote reisen nicht" (English: The dead don't travel).

Introduction and title music 
A little sensation for its time was the title sequence. Not only was the title music a haunting electronic theme composed by Jan Hammer (Playing Piano's, Synthesizers & Gretch Drums), it was accompanied by a wild camera ride in which a camera circles over a map of Europe, shows the different cities in which the episodes play and for each city shows a picture of the local detective with his name and title. Finally the camera zooms out into a picture of the police badge of the country in which the episode in question plays. Still a novelty for this time, the title was completely computer generated.

Cast and crew

Germany 
Produced by: Monaco Film, Munich for ZDF
Directors: Georg Althammer, Werner Kließ
cast:
Heiner Lauterbach as Thomas Dorn
Eva Kryll as Karin 
 City: Cologne

Austria 
Produced by: ORF
Directors: Rud'i Nemeth, Peter Müller
cast:
Bernd Jeschek as Peter 'Bernd' Brucker
Bigi Fischer as Bigi Herzog
Hermann Schmid as Oberinspektor Nurmeier
 City: Vienna

Switzerland 
Produced by: SRG
cast:
Alexander Radszun as Christian Merian
Wolfram Berger as Peter Brodbeck
 City: Basel

Italy 
Produced by: RAI2
Music by: Stefano Mainetti (9 episodes)
cast:
Diego Abatantuono as Commissario Bruno Corso
Bruno Pagni as Marco

France 
Produced by: France 2
cast:
Patrick Raynal as Commissaire Nicolas Villars
Bertrand Lacy as Commissaire Luc Rousseau
Étienne Chicot as Jérôme Cortal
François Perrot
 City: Marseille

Spain 
Produced by: Velarde Films for Televisión Española
cast:
Álvaro de Luna as Subcomisario Andrés Crespo

United Kingdom 
Produced by: Picture Palace Productions for Channel 4
Director: Malcom Craddock
cast:
John Benfield as Detective Constable George Jackson
Linda Henry as Linda Jackson
Jonathan Phillips as Stonehead
David Bradley as Roper

See also
List of German television series

External links
 
 EUROCOPS, BFI
 http://krimiserien.heimat.eu/e/eurocops.htm
 https://web.archive.org/web/20120530132040/http://www.tvsi.de/krimiserien/eurocops.php
 odeonfilm.de Folgen der Monaco Film (heute Odeon-Film)

1988 German television series debuts
1993 German television series endings
Fictional police officers
ZDF original programming
German crime television series
1980s German police procedural television series
1990s German police procedural television series